António de Almeida (14 November 1915 – 22 August 1994) was a Portuguese equestrian. He competed at the 1952 Summer Olympics, the 1956 Summer Olympics and the 1960 Summer Olympics.

References

External links
 

1915 births
1994 deaths
Portuguese male equestrians
Portuguese dressage riders
Olympic equestrians of Portugal
Equestrians at the 1952 Summer Olympics
Equestrians at the 1956 Summer Olympics
Equestrians at the 1960 Summer Olympics
Sportspeople from Coimbra